Basopenia (or basocytopenia) is a form of agranulocytosis associated with a deficiency of basophils. It has been proposed as an indicator of ovulation. It is difficult to detect without flow cytometry, because normal levels are so low. It can be defined as less than 0.01 x 109 / L.


Associated conditions
 Hereditary absence of basophils (very rare)
 Elevated levels of glucocorticoids
 Hyperthyroidism or treatment with thyroid hormones
 Ovulation
 Hypersensitivity reactions
urticaria
Anaphylaxis
Drug-induced reactions
 Leukocytosis (in association with diverse disorders)

References

External links 

Monocyte and granulocyte disorders